Macintosh (renamed Mac in 1999) is a family of personal computers designed by Apple Inc..

Macintosh may also refer to:

Macintosh computers 
 Macintosh 128K, the first computer produced under the Macintosh line, originally known as Apple Macintosh
 History of the Macintosh, from 1984 to 1997, before its rebrand to "Mac"
 List of Mac models, a comprehensive list of all Macintosh models produced by Apple Inc.
 Compact Macintosh, line of all-in-one Macintosh computers produced from 1984 to 1995
 Macintosh II family, line of high-end Macintosh computers produced from 1987 to 1993
 Macintosh LC family, line of entry-level Macintosh computers produced from 1990 to 1997
 Macintosh Quadra, line of high-end Macintosh computers produced from 1991 to 1995
 PowerBook, line of Macintosh laptop computers produced from 1991 to 2006
 Power Macintosh, line of high-end Macintosh computers produced from 1994 to 2006
 Mac operating systems, operating systems developed for Macintosh computers
 Classic Mac OS, the operating system used on Macintosh computers from 1984 to 2001
 "macintosh", an IANA registered character set name, referring to Mac OS Roman

Other uses 
 MacIntosh Forts, seven observation posts built in Hong Kong on the border with China between 1949 and 1953

See also 
 McIntosh (disambiguation)